Hanley Frías (born December 5, 1973 in Villa Altagracia, Dominican Republic) is a left-handed former baseball infielder, who last played for the Arizona Diamondbacks. He also played for the Texas Rangers at the beginning of his career.

He was an infielder who played for the Rangers and Diamondbacks in a four-year career where he played in 173 games with a BA of .232.

External links

1973 births
Living people
Arizona Diamondbacks players
Charleston Rainbows players
Dominican Republic expatriate baseball players in Canada
Dominican Republic expatriate baseball players in the United States
Edmonton Trappers players
Gulf Coast Rangers players
High Desert Mavericks players

Major League Baseball players from the Dominican Republic
Major League Baseball infielders
Memphis Redbirds players
Oklahoma City 89ers players
Charlotte Rangers players
Rochester Red Wings players
Texas Rangers players
Tucson Sidewinders players
Tulsa Drillers players